Federal Office Building may refer to:

in the United States
(by state)
Federal Office Building 6 (FOB 6), original name of the Lyndon Baines Johnson Department of Education Building in Washington, D.C.
Federal Office Building (Omaha, Nebraska), listed on the National Register of Historic Places (NRHP)
Federal Office Building (New York, New York), listed on the NRHP
Post Office, Courthouse, and Federal Office Building, Oklahoma City, Oklahoma, listed on the NRHP
Customs House (Nashville, Tennessee), also known as Federal Office Building, listed on the NRHP
Estes Kefauver Federal Building and United States Courthouse, Nashville, Tennessee, listed on the NRHP
Federal Office Building (Austin, Texas), listed on the NRHP in Travis County, Texas
Federal Office Building (Seattle, Washington), listed on the NRHP
Federal Office Building (Cheyenne, Wyoming), listed on the NRHP in Laramie Count

See also
Federal Building (disambiguation)
Federal Triangle, multiple buildings in Washington D.C.